Allahabad was an iron-hulled full-rigged ship, built in Liverpool in 1864. She was later re-rigged as a barque and disappeared in 1886 on a voyage from Scotland to New Zealand.

Construction and service
Allahabad was launched on 19 September 1864 by W H Potter & Company in Liverpool, as an iron full-rigged ship of 1,185 registered tons. The ship was built for the shipowner James Baines & Co. of Liverpool and began her maiden voyage from there, to Calcutta, on 10 December 1864.

In 1877 she was re-rigged as a barque and re-measured as 1,191 tons gross and 1,143 net register tons. At the time of her loss she was the property of Thomas Wall Stephens of London and him being the managing owner.

Loss
Allahabad last left Glasgow on 2 July 1886, with a crew of 20 and a cargo of 1,712 tons, of which 1,635 was coal, bound to Dunedin, New Zealand. From that time she has not been seen or heard of, and never arrived at her destination.

Citations

1864 ships
Ships built on the River Mersey
Maritime incidents in September 1886
Ships lost with all hands
Missing ships